Istocheta aldrichi, the winsome fly, is a species of bristle fly in the family Tachinidae. Originally from Japan, it has been introduced in North America in 1922 as a biocontrol to combat the Japanese beetle (Popillia japonica). It is established in northeastern North America. Larvae pupate inside the host beetle.

References

Further reading

External links

 

Exoristinae
Articles created by Qbugbot
Insects described in 1953
Insects used as insect pest control agents